The American Samoa national football team represents American Samoa in men's international association football and is controlled by the Football Federation American Samoa, the governing body of the sport in the territory. American Samoa's home ground is the Pago Park Soccer Stadium in Pago Pago and their head coach is Tunoa Lui.

History
In 1983, American Samoa entered a football team in the South Pacific Games for the first time. The territory's official first match took place in Apia, Western Samoa on August 20, 1983, and ended in a 3–1 defeat to Western Samoa. Two days later, the team recorded their first win with a 3–0 defeat of Wallis and Futuna however, they were eliminated from the competition at the group stage following a 3–2 loss to Tonga on August 24.

The following year, the American Samoa Football Association (ASFA) – now known as Football Federation American Samoa (FFAS) – was founded and took over responsibility for organizing the territory's national team.

After competing in the 1987 South Pacific Games and the 1994 Polynesia Cup, ASFA became full members of the Oceania Football Confederation (OFC) and the Fédération Internationale de Football Association (FIFA) allowing them to compete in the FIFA World Cup qualifiers for the first time. American Samoa registered their first FIFA-recognized international during the 1998 Polynesia Cup in Rarotonga, Cook Islands when they lost 3–0 to Tonga on September 2.

During their first qualifying campaign for the 2002 FIFA World Cup in April 2001, American Samoa was involved in a match which set the record for the largest margin of victory in international football when they lost 31–0 to Australia. The outcome of the match led to debates about the format of qualification tournaments, with the Australian manager Frank Farina and striker Archie Thompson – who scored 13 times in the match – feeling that preliminary rounds should be introduced to avoid such unbalanced matches, views shared by the international footballing body FIFA. It eventually led to the introduction of a preliminary round in the Oceanian zone qualification for the 2006 FIFA World Cup.

Since joining FIFA, the team has been regarded as one of the world's weakest teams and were, until November 2011, the joint-lowest ranked national team in the FIFA World ranking.

On November 23, 2011, American Samoa recorded their second and first FIFA-recognized win when they defeated Tonga 2–1 in the first round of qualifiers for the 2014 FIFA World Cup. It was also the team's first victory after 38 consecutive defeats.

The team's efforts to qualify for the 2014 FIFA World Cup were chronicled in a 2014 British documentary, Next Goal Wins, directed by Mike Brett and Steve Jamison.

In October 2015, the territory achieved its highest position in the FIFA World Rankings when they reached 164th following back-to-back wins against Tonga and the Cook Islands in qualifying for the 2018 FIFA World Cup.

Home stadium

American Samoa's home ground is the Pago Park Soccer Stadium in Pago Pago, however, the team has never played a home match in its history. The stadium featured in the highly rated 2014 film Next Goal Wins and was used as the national team's training ground in the build-up to the 2011 Pacific Games and the 2014 FIFA World Cup qualifiers.

Coaching staff

Coaching history

 Tiwo Kummings (2000)
 Anthony Langkilde (2001)
 Tunoa Lui (2001–2002)
 Ian Crook (2004)
 Nathan Mease (2007)
 David Brand (2007–2010)
 Iofi Lalogafuafua (2011)
 Thomas Rongen (2011)
 Larry Mana'o (2015–2019)
 Tunoa Lui (2019–present)

Players

Current squad
The following players were called up for the 2019 Pacific Games.

Caps and goals updated as of July 18, 2019, after the game against Tahiti.

Player records
Goalkeeper Nicky Salapu holds the record for the most appearances for American Samoa. Since his debut against Fiji on April 7, 2001, he has made 22 appearances for the national team – including the world record defeat to Australia and American Samoa's first FIFA-recognized victory against Tonga in November 2011. Ramin Ott holds the record for most goals for American Samoa after scoring three times in 15 appearances between 2004 and 2015. In total, 10 different players have scored a goal in a FIFA-recognized match for American Samoa.

.

Most capped players

Source:

Youngest player
Jaiyah Saelua – 15 years 300 days vs. Fiji on 15 May 2004

Oldest player
Nicky Salapu – 38 years 308 days vs. Tahiti on 18 July 2019

Top goalscorers

First goal
Duane Atuelevao – 12 March 2002 vs. Tonga

Most goals in a match
Demetrius Beauchamp – 2 vs. Samoa on 31 August 2015

Team records
Biggest victory: 3–0 vs. Wallis and Futuna on 22 August 1983
Heaviest defeat: 0–31 vs. Australia on 11 April 2001
Most consecutive victories: 2; achieved September 2015
Most consecutive matches without defeats: 2; achieved November 2011 and September 2015
Most consecutive matches without victory: 37 between 24 August 1983 and 5 September 2011
Most consecutive matches without scoring: 7 between 27 August 2007 and 5 September 2011

Competitive record

FIFA World Cup
Following FIFA affiliation in 1998, American Samoa first entered the qualifying competition for the 2002 FIFA World Cup. They have entered the qualifiers for each subsequent edition but have never made it beyond the first stage. The closest they came to reaching the second phase was in qualifying for the 2018 edition when they won two of their three matches and narrowly missed out on progressing on goal difference.

Notes

OFC Nations Cup
Before becoming full members of OFC in 1998, American Samoa entered the 1994 Polynesia Cup which acted as the qualifying round for Polynesian national teams for the 1996 OFC Nations Cup. This was the territory's first time competing for a place in OFC's flagship competition for senior men's national teams.

The OFC Nations Cup has often acted as part of the FIFA World Cup qualification process for Oceanian national teams and, as a result, American Samoa have competed in the qualifiers for both competitions in every edition since 1998. They have yet to qualify for either competition.

Notes

Pacific Games
American Samoa first entered the South Pacific Games in 1983. This was the first time a team representing the territory had competed in association football and they recorded one win from their three games in the group stage by beating Wallis and Futuna 3–0 – the only time American Samoa have recorded a win in the competition – but that wasn't enough to progress to the next round. American Samoa would go onto enter the 1987 edition where they were again eliminated in the group stage, losing all four of their matches.

It would be another 20 years before they again entered the competition. The 2007 edition was the last known as the South Pacific Games before becoming the Pacific Games four years later and it was also part of the qualification process for the 2010 FIFA World Cup. In their third appearance in the competition, American Samoa were again eliminated at the group stage, losing all four matches. The same fate befell American Samoa in the 2011 Pacific Games as they lost all five games to finish bottom of their group.

In 2015, the Pacific Games was an age-restricted tournament that doubled as the OFC Men's Olympic Qualifying Tournament and no team representing American Samoa took part. Four years later, they were again eliminated at the group stage however, a 1–1 draw with Tuvalu ended a 32-year losing streak in the competition.

Notes

Records and statistics

American Samoa played their first full international match against Papua New Guinea, which ended in a 20–0 loss. Their national team have suffered the world's biggest international defeat, by losing to Australia 31–0. American Samoa have only won against Cook Islands and Tonga. American Samoa have by far lost to all of these teams at least once.

Head-to-head record
The following table shows the American Samoa national football team's all-time international record. The statistics are composed of FIFA World Cup, OFC Nations Cup, Polynesia Cup and Pacific Games matches, as well as international friendlies.

Performance by competition
Up to matches played on 18 July 2019.

Notes

Performance by venue
Up to matches played on 18 July 2019.

See also
 American Samoa national under-23 football team
 American Samoa national under-20 football team
 American Samoa national under-17 football team
 American Samoa women's national football team
 American Samoa women's national under-17 football team

References

External links

 
 American Samoa at OFC
 American Samoa at FIFA
 List of American Samoa Internationals up to 2004

 
Football in American Samoa
Oceanian national association football teams